Starship Technologies is an Estonian company developing autonomous delivery vehicles. The company is headquartered in San Francisco, California, with engineering operations in Tallinn, Estonia and in Helsinki, Finland. Starship also has offices in London, UK, Germany, Washington, DC, US, and Mountain View, California, US.

In January and February 2022, Starship raised nearly US$100 million in funding from European Investment Bank and venture investors, which is expected to be put towards research and development and 1,700 additional robots to the company’s fleet. The company has raised approximately $202 million since being founded in 2014.

History 

Starship Technologies was founded by Skype co-founders Janus Friis and Ahti Heinla. Initially, it was called Project Echo. A core team of the company became the team Kuukulgur, which led by Ahti Heinla had participated in NASA Centennial Challenge by building experimental sample retrieval robots. Starship Technologies OÜ was registered on 11 June 2014 in Tallinn, Estonia. Starship Technologies, Inc., a Delaware corporation, was registered in San Francisco, United States, on 28 September 2016.

Starship Technologies launched pilot services in 2016, in the US and the UK among other countries, with commercial services launched in 2017. In April 2018, Starship launched its autonomous delivery service in Milton Keynes, England, in partnership with Co-op and Tesco. In March 2020, Starship became the first robot delivery service to operate in a British town center with the rollout of its service in Milton Keynes. By November 2020, said Starship, Milton Keynes had the 'world's largest autonomous robot fleet' By March 2023 Starship was delivering in seven British cities.

In January 2019, Starship partnered with Sodexo to launch robot food delivery services at George Mason University in Virginia, US. With a fleet of 25 robots at launch, this was the largest implementation of autonomous robot food delivery services on a university campus that time. In 2019, it expanded its services to other US universities: Northern Arizona University in Flagstaff, Purdue University in West Lafayette, University of Pittsburgh, James Madison University in Virginia, University of Wisconsin in Madison, University of Houston, and University of Texas at Dallas,
and in 2020 to the University of Mississippi and Bowling Green State University.

In March 2020, following the start of the COVID-19 pandemic, Starship made many redundancies. However, half a year later, and after the US universities reopened, it rehired many of the staff.

In October 2021, Starship said that its autonomous delivery robots had completed 2 million deliveries worldwide, with over 100,000 road crossings daily.
According to the company, it reached 100,000 deliveries in August 2019 and 500,000 deliveries in June 2020.

As of January 2022, Starship's autonomous delivery robots had made more than 2.5 million autonomous deliveries, and traveled over 3 million miles globally, making an average 10,000 deliveries per day.

Operations 

Starship develops and operates electrically-powered last-mile delivery robots. The robots use feature detection of edges and mapping techniques to determine the suitability of navigable terrain. Their average battery life is 18 hours, and the typical robot can travel around 40 km per day. The robots are equipped with a sensor suite that includes cameras, GPS, inertial measurement, ultrasonic sensors, radar, and possibly other sensors. The robots have loudspeakers to communicate with humans they meet. Users order Starship deliveries using the company's iOS and Android applications. Once the robot arrives to make a delivery, the user receives an alert and can unlock the robot through the app once their identity has been verified through biometric authentication technology.

Before operating commercially the service was tested in over 100 cities and 20 countries around the world. The company operates in the United States, the United Kingdom, Germany, Finland and Estonia. From 2019 Starship has focused mainly on delivery services on college campuses. It has announced plans to expand its service to 100 university campuses in the United States, with the goal of reaching one million students. During the COVID-19 pandemic, Starship expanded the number of delivery robots used for grocery in the UK and the US to help with the delivery driver shortage.

Sustainability 
According to Starship, its technology operates delivery robots that are "powered by zero carbon electricity, with the average delivery for a Starship robot consuming as little energy as boiling the kettle to make a single cup of tea". Starship Technologies worked in conjunction with Milton Keynes Council to conduct a study to review the impact of zero-emissions robots in cities over the course of 3 years. According to the study report, "Starship’s fleet has prevented 280,000 car journeys, and over 500,000 miles travelled in cars, leading to 137 tons of CO2 saved, and 22 kg of NOx saved during the study period".

Corporate matters
The Starship's original headquarters were established in London but were moved to San Francisco in 2018.  Its engineering operations are located in Tallinn, Estonia and in Helsinki, Finland.

In 2014–2018, Allan Martinson served as the chief operating officer of Starship. In 2018, the chief executive officer Ahti Heinla switched to the position of the chief technology officer and Lex Bayer, Airbnb's former head of business development, payments, and Airbnb for business, was hired as the new CEO. Starship hired Alastair Westgarth, former CEO of Google X company, Loon, as their CEO in June 2021.

By 2019, Starship had received US$85 million in venture funding. In addition to Janus Friis and Ahti Heinla, other investors include Airbnb co-founder Nathan Blecharczyk, Skype founding engineer Jaan Tallinn, Morpheus Ventures, Shasta Ventures, Matrix Partners, MetaPlanet Holdings, Daimler AG, Grishin Robotics, ZX Ventures, Playfair Capital and others.

In January 2022, Starship received a €50 million investment from the European Investment Bank.

Starship also announced a partnership with Veriff in January 2022 to provide authentication and re-verification services for its fleet of autonomous delivery robots in the UK. This partnership makes Starship the first company to create a fully autonomous end-to-end delivery service for age restricted items.

Economically, Starship's robots are considered to be cheaper than human-staffed delivery services such as DoorDash, which uses human-driven vehicles. Starship's robots cost US$5500 in 2018, and it was hoped to reduce this to $2250. Fully-charged they can run for 18 hours. However, a 2016 McKinsey report said that bicycles were still the most cost-competitive last-mile delivery method: "If droids do not become significantly cheaper, bike couriers are likely to be the best delivery form for instant delivery in urban areas."

Disadvantages of automated couriers
Automated delivery services using pedestrian spaces—not restricted to Starship—have several problems in busy cities which are not present in quieter locations. They must avoid pedestrians on busy footways, which may be narrow, and are subject to vandalism, even if cargo is secured against theft. Starship have said "After our robots have been in an area for a while, people get used to them. They become part of the community and residents look out for their well-being", though the robots did sometimes get kicked. They must compete with bicycle couriers for short-distance small deliveries.

See also 

 
Nuro, a similar autonomous delivery vehicle, though larger at the size of a tiny car, and driving on the road.

References

External links 

 

2014 establishments in Estonia
Robotics companies of Estonia
Logistics companies of Estonia
Robotics companies of the United States
Logistics companies of the United States
Technology companies established in 2014
Transport companies established in 2014
Transportation companies based in California